MarkMonitor Inc. is an American software company founded in 1999. It develops software intended to protect corporate brands from Internet counterfeiting, fraud, piracy, and cybersquatting. MarkMonitor also develops and publishes reports on the prevalence of brand abuse on the Internet.

In November 2022, the company was acquired by Newfold Digital.

History
MarkMonitor was founded in 1999 in Boise, Idaho and its initial business as a service provider for the protection of corporate trademarks on the Internet. In 2000, it gained ICANN accreditation status for domain registration and acquired a domain management business called AllDomains the following year.

In October 2010, MarkMonitor acquired an anti-piracy company (DtecNet) and was itself purchased by Thomson Reuters' Intellectual Property & Science business in July 2012. In 2016, the IP division of Reuters, including MarkMonitor, was sold to two venture capital companies, under the new parent company Clarivate Analytics.

In 2022, Clarivate announced that Newfold Digital purchased its subsidiary. Backed by the Clearlake and Siris groups, Newfold is a web and commerce technology provider.

Research
According to the MarkMonitor web site, it has been publishing a report called the Brandjacking Index since 2007, to assess how Internet threats affect corresponding brands. The company's annual report says that cybersquatting increased 18 percent in 2008 and "phishing attacks" rose 36 percent in the first quarter of 2009.

In 2010, the company estimated that $200 billion in revenues is lost annually as a result of worldwide counterfeiting and piracy on the Internet.  The 2011 report said the company had identified 23,000 listings "for clones, suspected counterfeits, or gray market" versions of tablet computers  by 8,000 sellers. A 2011 opinion piece in Techdirt criticized the research methodology of MarkMonitor's report.

Corporate structure

Half of MarkMonitor's employees are based at its San Francisco facility where its "brand protection solutions" division is located. Domain development, administration and customer service personnel are located in Boise, Idaho, and their anti-fraud and security center is based in Washington DC.

Products and services
According to MarkMonitor, it develops and markets brand protection software and services to combat counterfeiting, piracy, cybersquatting and paid search scams in four categories; domain management, antifraud software, brand protection and antipiracy. The Idaho Statesman reported that "MarkMonitor safeguards more than half of the Fortune 100 brands". MarkMonitor provides services to Google, Microsoft, Amazon, Tencent, YouTube, Wikipedia, and eBay, among others.

References

External links
 

Clarivate
Online companies of the United States
Software companies established in 1999
1999 establishments in California
American companies established in 1999
2022 mergers and acquisitions